Las Tablas is a town and corregimiento in the Changuinola District of Bocas del Toro Province of Panama. It was created by Law 40 of April 30, 2003.

References

Corregimientos of Bocas del Toro Province